SBI Cards & Payment Services Ltd., previously known as SBI Cards & Payment Services Private Limited, is a pure play credit card company and payment solutions provider in India. SBI Card was launched in October 1998 by State Bank of India, India's largest bank, and GE Capital. In December 2017, State Bank of India and The Carlyle Group  acquired GE Capital's stake in the company. SBI Card is headquartered in Gurugram, Haryana/Delhi NCR and have branches in over 100 cities across India. The company is the only publicly listed pure-play credit card issuer in India.

Shareholding
State Bank of India held 60% share in SBI Cards & Payment Services Limited (SBICPSL) and 40% share in GE Capital Business Processes Management Services Limited (GECBPMSL). GE Capital held 60% in GE Capital Business Processes Management Services Limited and 40% in SBI Cards & Payment Services Limited.

In 2017, GE Capital exited its JV with State Bank of India as a part of its global strategy to exit financial services sector. Following this development, State Bank of India increased its share to 74% and The Carlyle Group invested 26% in both the entities while replacing GE Capital. SBI Card is now a listed company on India's BSE and NSE stock exchanges.

New brand identity
In February 2019, SBI Card unveiled new brand identity designed to appeal to the millennial generation. The redefined identity reflects the brand's contemporary and youth-focused outlook and its endeavour to build a stronger connect with millennial consumers. As part of the brand makeover, SBI Card also unveiled its new logo. The logo retains the blue keyhole and SBI wordmark for while the styling for the word ‘Card’ has been changed to a different typeface.

Milestones
1998: SBI Card enters the credit card space
1999: Reaches the ‘100,000’ mark within 10 months of launch
2002: SBI Card reaches the 1,000,000 mark
2002: First partnership with a public sector bank
2003: SBI Card launches 8 Cities Affinity Cards with special tie-ups and offers
2005: The 2 Million Cards Milestone reached
2006: SBI Card launches SBI Railway Card for Indian Railway travellers
2006: The launch of co-brand cards, SBI Spicejet Card and TATA Cards, India's first loyalty cum credit card
2006: SBI Card becomes the second largest credit card issuer, with 3 million cards issued
2010: SBI Platinum Card launched
2011: Launches chip-based EMV Cards
2012: Launches SBI Signature Card for HNIs
2013: SBI Card launches the Air India SBI Signature Card and the Air India SBI Platinum Card
2014: Launch of fbb SBI STYLEUP Card
2014: SBI Card reaches the 3,000,000 milestone for issued cards
2015: Launch of SimplySAVE and SimplyCLICK SBI Card
2016: Launch of SBI Card ELITE
2016: SBI Card reaches the 4,000,000 milestone with issued cards
2017: Launch of Central SBI Card. SBI Card Unnati, Tata Star Card and BPCL SBI Card
2017: SBI Card reaches the 5,000,000 milestone with issued cards
2018: Launch of Doctor's SBI Card and Apollo SBI Card
2018: SBI Card reaches the 6,000,000 milestone for issued cards
2019: Launch of SME Business Card, OLA Money SBI Credit Card, Etihad Guest SBI Card and Allahabad Bank SBI Card
2019: SBI Card reaches the 8,000,000 milestone for issued cards
2019: SBI Card reaches the 9,000,000 milestone for issued cards
2020: In February 2020, SBI card offered the biggest initial public offering of 2020
2020: SBI Card launches Lifestyle HC SBI Card, Max SBI Card and Spar SBI Card with Landmark Group
2020: SBI Card launches IRCTC SBI Contactless Credit Card on RuPay platform
2020: SBI Card partners Google, enables cardholders to make payments using Google Pay
2020: SBI Card partners with DMRC to launch contactless Delhi Metro SBI Card
2020: SBI Card partners with Paytm to launch contactless Paytm SBI Card
2020: SBI Card launches BPCL SBI Card OCTANE 
2021: Fabindia SBI Card SELECT and Fabindia SBI Card launched
2021: SBI Card reaches the milestone for 12,000,000 issued cards
2021: SBI launches SBI Pulse Credit Card for fitness and health enthusiasts

Awards
Reader's Digest 'Most Trusted Brand Gold Award' (2008, 2009, 2010, 2012, 2013)
Rated #2 in CNBC Consumer Awards 2 years in a row (2007–2009)
Winner of Best Mature Captive Delivery Unit in Asia (2009)
Reader's Digest ‘Most Trusted Brand Gold Award' (2008)
Rated #2 in Business World Survey on Customer Satisfaction (2007)
‘Most Innovative Technology Legacy Transformation’ award for Card One Customer Relationship Management tool at International Gartner Awards 2016

See also
SBI Life Insurance Company

References

External links 
 Official website

Credit cards in India
Debit cards
State Bank of India
Companies based in Gurgaon
1998 establishments in Haryana
Indian companies established in 1998
Financial services companies established in 1998
Companies listed on the National Stock Exchange of India
Companies listed on the Bombay Stock Exchange